Thedavur is a panchayat town in Salem district in the Indian state of Tamil Nadu.

History
Around 1200 CE, there were 2 major forces ruling in the neighborhood, Aragalur (Nadu Naadu of Magadai Mandalam) ruled by Ponparappinan and Thedavur by Vanakkovaraiyars.

Demographics
 India census, Thedavur had a population of 7453. Males constitute 51% of the population and females 49%. Thedavur has an average literacy rate of 53%, lower than the national average of 59.5%: male literacy is 63%, and female literacy is 43%. In Thedavur, 12% of the population is under 6 years of age.

Geography

References

Cities and towns in Salem district